Paper Heart is a 2009 American romantic comedy film starring Charlyne Yi and Michael Cera as fictionalized versions of themselves based on their rumored relationship, though Yi has said they never dated.

The plot for the film is based on Charlyne Yi's original idea of a documentary, which Nick Jasenovec suggested would be accentuated with a fictional storyline.

Plot
"Will I ever find love" is her question, and Charlyne Yi embarks on a quest across America to answer, what is love. She and her good friend (and director) Nick search for answers and advice about love.

Charlyne asks people on the street, regular folks, her famous (and not) friends like Seth Rogen, Demetri Martin, bikers, romance novelists, kids and even scientists or other 'experts' of love. They each offer diverse views on modern romance, as well as various answers to the age-old question: does true love really exist?

Shortly after filming begins, Charlyn has a "chance meeting"  with Michael Cera at a party (a fictionalised verson of himself, a part of the script). He begins to take an interest in her, and they get more comfortable with each other as the camera and director follow them around. As they go across the country, she connects with Michael and they start dating.

A docufiction, there are three actors in this film, Jake M. Johnson is the only one who plays a role (Nicholas Jasenovec, the director of this film). Yi and Cera are fictionalised versions of themselves, and all the rest are "himself" or "herself". Real couples talk about their own definitions of what love is. Here and there, there are also some stop-motion animation segments, to accompany people’s anectdotes about love.

There are flat-out documentary segments, exploring love in a wide spectrum. Interviews from around America range from innocent children, to complete theories from scientists. It's like Love 101 for Dummies, with personal interpretations from sharing their most memorable anecdotes.

In the end credits, there is a touching yet comedic love song performed by Charlyne Yi, and a little stinger to finalize.

Cast

 Charlyne Yi as herself
 Michael Cera as himself
 Jake Johnson as Nicholas Jasenovec
Cameos
 Seth Rogen
 Demetri Martin
 Martin Starr
 Derek Waters
 Paul Rust
 Paul Scheer

Release
Paper Heart received a limited release on August 7, 2009, in the United States and Canada, making $1,286,744. It has been released on home media.

Reception

Paper Heart received mixed reviews by critics and currently holds a 60% "Fresh" rating on Rotten Tomatoes. Roger Ebert gave the film 3 out of 4 stars. The film won the Waldo Salt Screenwriting Award at the Sundance Film Festival.

Soundtrack

The soundtrack of Paper Heart was released on August 4, 2009 by Lakeshore Records and contains music composed primarily by Michael Cera and Charlyne Yi. Alden Penner was the producer.

References

External links
 
 
 
 
 

2000s mockumentary films
2009 romantic comedy-drama films
2009 films
American romantic comedy-drama films
Films shot in New Mexico
American mockumentary films
Overture Films films
2009 comedy films
2009 drama films
2000s English-language films
2000s American films